William Reinhar(d)t may refer to:

Real people
William Reinhardt (mathematician), see Ackermann set theory
William Reinhart, athlete

Fictional characters
William Reinhardt, character in Hell House (novel)
William Reinhardt (The Passage)